Matthias Haeder (born 23 February 1989) is a German professional footballer who plays as an attacking midfielder or forward for FC Gütersloh.

References

External links
 
 

Living people
1989 births
German footballers
Association football midfielders
Association football forwards
Germany youth international footballers
3. Liga players
Regionalliga players
Arminia Bielefeld players
SC Verl players
FC Gütersloh 2000 players